Cathy Wilkes (born 1966) is a Northern Irish artist who lives and works in Glasgow. She makes sculpture, paintings, and installations. She was the recipient of the Inaugural Maria Lassnig Prize in 2017 and was commissioned to create the British Pavilion in Venice in 2019.

Life and work

Wilkes was born in Dundonald near Belfast. She attended Glasgow School of Art from 1985 to 1988, and subsequently completed an MFA at the University of Ulster in 1992. She lives and works in Glasgow.

Her works often feature items from daily life or items of a domestic nature, such as baking parchment, cups, plates and biscuits.

Wilkes represented Scotland at the Venice Biennale in 2005, and will be representing the United Kingdom at the 2019 event.

In 2008, Wilkes received a Turner Prize nomination in the "Sculpture, film, sound, performance" category. In 2017, Wilkes received the Inaugural Maria Lassnig Prize.

References

External links
Cathy Wilkes at Xavier Hufkens, Brussels
Turner Prize 2008 at the Tate
Guardian exhibition review – A review of her exhibition from 2001 in the Transmission Gallery.
Art Monthly exhibition review – A review of her exhibition in 2008 in Milton Keynes.

1966 births
Living people
Artists from Belfast
British women artists
Sculptors from Northern Ireland
Bâloise Prize winners
Irish contemporary artists
Alumni of the Glasgow School of Art
Alumni of Ulster University
Artists from Northern Ireland